Fospropofol (INN), often used as the disodium salt (trade name Lusedra) is an intravenous  sedative-hypnotic agent. It is currently approved for use in sedation of adult patients undergoing diagnostic or therapeutic procedures such as endoscopy.

Clinical applications
Several water-soluble derivatives and prodrugs of the widely used intravenous anesthetic agent propofol have been developed, of which fospropofol has been found to be the most suitable for clinical development thus far. Purported advantages of this water-soluble chemical compound include less pain at the site of intravenous administration, less potential for hyperlipidemia with long-term administration, and less chance for bacteremia. Often, fospropofol is administered in conjunction with an opioid such as fentanyl.

Clinical pharmacology

Mechanism of action
Fospropofol is a prodrug of propofol; it is metabolized by alkaline phosphatases to an active metabolite, propofol.

Pharmacodynamics

Pharmacokinetics
Initial trial results on fospropofol pharmacokinetics were retracted by the investigators. As of 2011, new results were not available.

Controlled substance
Fospropofol is classified as a Schedule IV controlled substance in the United States' Controlled Substances Act.

References 

General anesthetics
Sedatives
Phenol ethers
Prodrugs
GABAA receptor positive allosteric modulators
Isopropyl compounds
Phosphate esters